Judy Singer (born April 12, 1951) is an Australian sociologist, known for coining the term neurodiversity.

Biography
As the daughter of a Jewish mother who survived World War II, Judy Singer grew up in Australia. For many years, she worked as a computer consultant and later became a single mother. She noticed traits in her daughter that resembled the social difficulties of her mother. Later, Singer's daughter was diagnosed with Asperger syndrome. Singer has also described herself as "likely somewhere on the autistic spectrum."

Before the diagnosis, Judy began studying sociology at the University of Technology Sydney and delved into British and American disability studies. While following the virtual activism of autistic and other neurologically different people in the mid-1990s, particularly on the Independent Living Mailing List (ILMV) forum, she met journalist Harvey Blume. Singer coined the term neurodiversity to represent both the idea of neurological diversity and to think about the existence of a social movement of neurological minorities that would also include the autism rights movement.

In Australia, Singer also created ASpar, a group to support families of autistic people. In 2016, she published the book Neurodiversity: The Birth of an Idea.

Publications
Neurodiversity: The birth of an Idea (2016)

References

1951 births
Autism rights movement
Australian disability rights activists
Disability studies academics
Living people